The Monroe Street Bridge is a bascule bridge that crosses the Chicago River in downtown Chicago, Illinois. It was constrcuted by Burns & McDonnell.

References

External links
 
 Monroe Street and Chicago Street Bridge Houses Renovation, Burns & McDonnell
 Chicago River Bascule Bridge, Monroe Street, Spanning South Branch of Chicago River at Monroe Street, Chicago, Cook County, IL, Library of Congress

Bascule bridges in the United States
Bridges completed in 1919
Bridges in Chicago
Road bridges in Illinois